Arab al-Fuqara (Arabic: عرب الفقراء) was a Palestinian Arab village in the Haifa Subdistrict. It was depopulated during the 1947–1948 Civil War in Mandatory Palestine on April 10, 1948. At that time, the land records of the village consisted of a total area of 2,714 dunams, of which 2,513 were owned by Jews, 15 owned by Arabs, and the remaining 186 dunams being public lands.

Location
The village  was located 42 km southwest of Haifa, south of Wadi al-Mafjar and northwest of Hadera, in a flat, sandy area.

History

In 1882, the PEF's Survey of Western Palestine (SWP)  described a local Mukam Sheikh Helu here, and noted a few adobe houses near, which were not noticed in the official [Government] lists.

British Mandate era
The Arab villagers were descendants of a section of the al-Balawina Bedouin tribe, whose primary territory was near Beersheba. The area was generally swampy and malarial, and this limited population growth until the mid-1920s.

The gradual and legal expansion of the Jewish town Hadera reduced the free public land available to the Arab villagers, until only a thin strip of land between Hadera and Wadi al-Mafjar was retained (15 dunams), where the land was considered non-cultivable.

The village population in the 1945 statistics  was 310, all Muslims.

1948 and aftermath
On 6 April 1948, the Haganah implemented a new policy for the coastal plains, namely of clearing the whole area of its Arab inhabitants. On 10 April, the villagers of Arab al-Fuqara, together with the villagers of Arab al-Nufay'at and Arab Zahrat al-Dumayri, were ordered to leave the area.

Following the 1948 war, the area was incorporated into the State of Israel and the village's land is now part of the northwestern area of Hadera.

References

Bibliography

External links
  Maqam sheikh Hilu
Welcome To 'Arab al-Fuqara'
 Arab al-Fuqara', from Zochrot
Survey of Western Palestine, Map 7:   IAA, Wikimedia commons 
Arab al-Fuqara', from the Khalil Sakakini Cultural Center

Arab villages depopulated prior to the 1948 Arab–Israeli War
District of Haifa